The William F. Connell School of Nursing (CSON) is the professional nursing school at Boston College in Chestnut Hill, Massachusetts.

The Connell School of Nursing awards undergraduate, master's and doctoral degrees, while offering a continuing education program for practitioners in the field. Its graduate program in nursing ranks among the nation's top programs, according to U.S. News & World Report. Its Doctor of Philosophy (Ph.D.) program was the first nursing doctoral program to be offered at a Jesuit university. The Connell School was the first full-time undergraduate program to accept women at Boston College.

History
The School of Nursing, as it was then known, was founded in 1947 at the behest of Archbishop Richard Cushing, who saw the need for a bachelor degree-granting school of nursing under Catholic auspices in the Greater Boston area. Mary Maher, who served on the faculty of the Massachusetts General Hospital School, was appointed dean in November 1946. At that time, Boston College was an all-male college and the nursing program was the first full-time undergraduate program to open to women. Initially, 35 registered nurses enrolled in January 1947 for a Bachelor of Science (B.S.) degree in nursing or nursing education, followed by 27 secondary school graduates in the fall. In 1948, Rita P. Kellcher, who held degrees in nursing from Columbia and Boston University, was named dean following Maher's brief tenure.

The nursing school was initially located at the university's professional school building at 126 Newbury Street in downtown Boston. Nursing students had to commute to Chestnut Hill on Tuesdays and Thursdays to take their lab classes in Devlin Hall. The master's program was established in 1958. Two years later, the school's second home, Cushing Hall, was dedicated on March 25, 1960.

The school reached a milestone when a Ph.D. program began in 1988, making Boston College the first Jesuit university to offer a doctorate in nursing. In 2003, the School of Nursing was renamed after Boston College alumnus and businessman William F. Connell. In 2015, after more than five decades in Cushing Hall, the Connell School moved to Maloney Hall, constructed in 2002 on the university's lower campus.

Traditions
Each year, Connell School graduates who enter into the nursing field receive a nursing pin, which depicts the official Boston College seal and is inscribed with the words "For Religion and the Liberal Arts" in Latin, during a pinning ceremony that can be traced back to Florence Nightingale's service during the Crimean War.

The school's Pinnancle Lecture Series brings a widely recognized leader in the field of nursing to Boston College each semester to address an issue at the forefront of health care. Past keynote speakers include alumna Terry Fulmer, dean of New York University College of Nursing; Margaret Grey, a Yale School of Nursing professor; Patricia Flatley Brennan, director of the U.S. National Library of Medicine; and Susan Orsega, chief nurse officer at the U.S. Public Health Service.

The Dean Rita P. Kelleher Award is presented annually during reunion to an accomplished Connell School graduate.

Clinical partners
Clinical teaching takes place in more than 85 health care facilities in the metropolitan Boston area. Some of these include:

 Arbour Hospital
 Bedford Veteran's Administration Hospital
 Beth Israel Deaconess Medical Center
 Boston Medical Center
 Boston Public Health Commission
 Boston Public Schools
 Brigham and Women's Hospital
 Cambridge Health Alliance
 Children's Hospital
 Dana Farber Cancer Institute
 Harvard Vanguard Medical Associates
 Lahey Clinic
 Massachusetts General Hospital
 McLean Hospital
 Newton-Wellesley Hospital
 Partners Home Care, Inc.
 Pine Street Inn
 Shriner's Burn Institute
 Steward St. Elizabeth's Medical Center
 Tufts Medical Center
 UMass Memorial Medical Center
 VA Boston Healthcare System

See also
List of nursing schools in the United States

References

External links
 

Boston College
Nursing schools in Massachusetts
Educational institutions established in 1947
1947 establishments in Massachusetts
Educational institutions established in 2003
2003 establishments in Massachusetts